The Prix France-Québec is a Canadian literary award, presented to a Canadian French language writer who has published work in either Canada or France.

Administered by Quebec's General Delegation in Paris and the Fédération France-Quebec, the award was first presented in 1958 as the Prix Québec-Paris. Although nominally presented for an individual title, in practice it was often awarded to honour the writer's entire body of work. Following the 1997 awards, it was renamed to Prix France-Québec in 1998.

Winners

Prix Québec-Paris
1958 - Anne Hébert, Les Chambres de bois
1961 - Yves Thériault, Agaguk and Ashini
1962 - Jean Le Moyne, Convergences and Jacques Godbout, L'Aquarium
1963 - Alain Grandbois, Poèmes and Gilles Marcotte, Une littérature qui se fait
1964 - Jean-Paul Pinsonneault, Les Terres sèches
1965 - Georges-André Vachon, Le Temps et l'Espace dans l'œuvre de Claudel
1966 - Roland Giguère, L'Âge de la parole
1967 - Jean Éthier-Blais, Signets I et II
1968 - Jacques Brault, Mémoire et Étude sur Alain Grandbois
1969 - Jean-Guy Pilon, Comme eau retenue
1970 - Gaston Miron, L'Homme rapaillé
1971 - Naïm Kattan, Le Réel et le Théâtral
1972 - Fernand Ouellette, Poésie
1973 - Rina Lasnier, Poèmes, tomes I et II
1974 - Jacques Folch-Ribas, Une aurore boréale
1975 - Antonine Maillet, Mariaagélas
1976 - Réjean Ducharme, Les Enfantômes
1977 - Louis Caron, L'Emmitouflé
1978 - André G. Bourassa, Surréalisme dans la littérature québécoise
1979 - Victor-Lévy Beaulieu, Monsieur Melville
1980 - Claude Jasmin, La Sablière
1981 - Laurent Mailhot et Pierre Nepveu, Anthologie de la poésie québécoise
1982 - Roger Fournier, Le Cercle des arènes
1983 - Suzanne Jacob, Laura Laur
1984 - Michel Tremblay, La Duchesse et le Roturier et Des nouvelles d'Édouard
1985 - Robert Lalonde, Une belle journée d'avance
1986 - Jacques Boulerice, Apparence
1987 - Gérald Godin, Ils ne demandaient qu'à brûler
1988 - Pierre Morency, Quand nous serons
1989 - Jacques Poulin, Le Vieux Chagrin
1990 - Yves Préfontaine, Parole tenue, poèmes 1954-1985
1991 - Paul Zumthor, La Traversée
1992 - Pauline Harvey, Un homme est une valse
1993 - Monique Proulx, Homme invisible à la fenêtre
1994 - Sergio Kokis, Le Pavillon des miroirs
1995 - Ying Chen, L'Ingratitude
1996 - Francine D'Amour, Presque rien
1997 - Jean-Jacques Nattiez, Opera

Prix France-Québec
1998 - Bruno Hébert, C’est pas moi, je le jure!
1999 - Abla Farhoud, Le bonheur à la queue glissante
2000 - Christiane Duchesne, L’Homme des silences
2001 - Micheline Lafrance, Le don d’Auguste
2002 - Guillaume Vigneault, Chercher le vent
2003 - Esther Croft, De belles paroles
2004 - Jean Lemieux, On finit toujours par payer
2005 - Jean Barbe, Comment devenir un monstre
2006 - Sergio Kokis, La Gare
2007 - Myriam Beaudoin, Hadassa
2008 - Christine Eddie, Les Carnets de Douglas
2009 - Marie-Christine Bernard, Mademoiselle Personne
2010 - Michèle Plomer, HKPQ
2011 - Lucie Lachapelle, Rivière Mékiskan
2012 - Jocelyne Saucier, Il pleuvait des oiseaux
2013 - Marie-Hélène Poitras, Griffintown
2014 - Catherine Leroux, Le mur mitoyen
2015 - Biz, Mort-Terrain
2016 - Anaïs Barbeau-Lavalette, La femme qui fuit
2017 - Christian Guay-Poliquin, Le Poids de la neige
2018 - Éric Plamondon, Taqawan
2019 - Matthieu Simard, Les Écrivements
2020 - Michel Jean, Kukum
2021 - Louis-François Dallaire, Le jour où mon meilleur ami fut arrêté pour le meurtre de sa femme

References

Canadian fiction awards
Awards established in 1958
1958 establishments in Canada
Quebec awards